is a live action Japanese film that was released in 1988. The is a sequel to the TV series Sukeban Deka III: Shōjo Ninpō-chō Denki, based on the manga series Sukeban Deka which was written and illustrated by Shinji Wada. It stars the TV series's lead Yui Asaka.

The movie was followed by a third, unrelated movie entitled Yo-Yo Girl Cop in the year 2006.

Synopsis
After the events of Sukeban Deka III, the 17-year-old Saki Asamiya III, Yui Kazama, works for the Juvenile Security Bureau, an expansion of the Sukeban Deka project. This organization is led by politician Kuraudo Sekine, who fights juvenile crime in drastic manners that include summary executions, as reflected by his student agents's triple-bladed yo-yo weapons. However, when Sekine's methods become too zealous, Yui refuses to undertake undercover missions for them and quits the bureau.

Yui tries to resume her normal life along with her older sisters Yuka and Yuma, but she eventually returns to action after learning Sekine and his agents are staging terrorist attacks and blaming them on a gang called the Outcast League. After they discover that Sekine's actual goal is to overthrow the Japanese government, the Kazama sisters are forced to team up with the outcasts and their disenchanted leader Kei to stop Sekine.

Cast
 Yui Asaka as Yui Kazama / Sukeban Deka III
 Yuka Onishi as Yuka Kazama
 Yuma Nakamura as Yuma Kazama
 Masaki Kyomoto as Kuraudo Sekine
 Kosuke Toyohara as Kyosuke Bando
 Minako Fujishiro as Tohko Agawa
 Hiroyuki Nagato as Dark Inspector
 Nagare Hagiwara as Kazuya Yoda
 Shinjirō Ehara as Secretary of Justice
 Mamiko Tayama as Kei
 Koji Tanaka as Goro
 Gannosuke Yamamoto as Kaita
 Yosuke Inozaki as Jun
 Takeshi Iwase as Taro
 Kippei Shiina as JSB agent

References

External links
 

1988 films
1988 action films
Films directed by Hideo Tanaka
Japanese sequel films
Live-action films based on manga
1980s Japanese films